Ilača railway station is a railway station on Novska–Tovarnik railway in Croatia. The station is operated by Croatian Railways, the state-owned railway company. It is located at the southern edge of the village of Ilača.

On 19 January 2012 reconstruction of the Ilača railway station was completed. It was a part of reconstruction of nine railway stations on 67 kilometers route between Vinkovci and Tovarnik-Croatia–Serbia border funded from the Instrument for Pre-Accession Assistance of the European Union (48%) and Croatian Government (52%).

See also
Tovarnik railway station
Vinkovci railway station
Zagreb–Belgrade railway
Ilača apparitions

References 

Railway stations in Croatia